The 1828 Connecticut gubernatorial election was held on April 10, 1828. Incumbent governor and National Republican nominee Gideon Tomlinson ran essentially unopposed, winning with 97.73% of the vote amidst a scattering of votes.

General election

Candidates
Major party candidates

Gideon Tomlinson, National Republican/Anti-Jacksonian

Results

References

1828
Connecticut
Gubernatorial